Andrea Rodrigues may refer to:
 Andrea Rodrigues (footballer)
 Andrea Rodrigues (judoka)